Thomas Edwards (c.1775–1845) was a British legal writer.

Life
Edwards studied at Trinity Hall, Cambridge, where he proceeded LL.B. in 1800 and LL.D. in 1805. He was also a fellow of Trinity Hall, and was admitted advocate at Doctors' Commons. Edwards was a magistrate for the county of Surrey, and took considerable interest in questions connected with the improvement of the people. He died at the Grove, Carshalton, on 20 October 1845.

Works
 Reports of Cases argued and determined in the High Court of Admiralty; commencing with the Judgments of Sir William Scott, Easter Term, 1808, 1812; reprinted in America.
 A Letter to the Lord-lieutenant of the County of Surrey on the Misconduct of Licensing Magistrates and the consequent Degradation of the Magistracy, 1825.
 Reasons for Refusing to Sign the Lay Address to the Archbishop of Canterbury, 2nd edition, 1835 (concerning the ritual of the church)

References

1775 births
1845 deaths
18th-century English non-fiction writers
18th-century English male writers
19th-century English non-fiction writers
Alumni of Trinity Hall, Cambridge
English legal writers
Fellows of Trinity Hall, Cambridge
Members of Doctors' Commons